John Patrick Heinrick (October 1, 1904 – May 15, 1995) was an American football and basketball coach. He served as the head football coach at the University of Puget Sound from 1948 to 1964, compiling a record of 89–46–11. Heinrick was also the head basketball coach at from Puget Sound 1947 to 1959, tallying a mark of 187–159.

Heinrick died on May 15, 1995, of natural causes as a healthcare center in Puyallup, Washington.

Head coaching record

College football

References

External links
 

1904 births
1995 deaths
Basketball coaches from Washington (state)
Puget Sound Loggers football coaches
Puget Sound Loggers men's basketball coaches
Washington State Cougars football players
High school football coaches in Washington (state)
Players of American football from Tacoma, Washington